Huaxi Township is a township under the administration of Xiaochang County, Hubei, China. , it has one residential community and 33 villages under its administration.

References 

Township-level divisions of Hubei
Xiaochang County